Peter Vargo (1 October 1941 – 14 March 2017) was an Austrian footballer. He played in two matches for the Austria national football team in 1963.

References

External links
 

1941 births
2017 deaths
Austrian footballers
Austria international footballers
Place of birth missing
Association footballers not categorized by position